Brian George Clegg (12 April 1930 – 20 January 2007) was an Australian rules footballer who played with South Melbourne in the Victorian Football League (VFL).

Clegg made two appearances, as a half back flanker, in the 1951 VFL season. He played those games beside his brother, Brownlow Medal winner Ron Clegg.

He later made a name for himself in the Ballarat Football League, where he played for Geelong West. In 1956 he won the league's best and fairest award.

References

1930 births
Australian rules footballers from Victoria (Australia)
Sydney Swans players
Geelong West Football Club players
2007 deaths